This is a list of notable Macedonians or people of Macedonian descent sorted by occupation and year of birth, regardless of any political, territorial or other divisions, historical or modern.

Academia

Scientists
Blaga Aleksova (1922–2007), archaeologist
Ana Čolović Lešoska (born 1979), biologist
Georgi Efremov (1932–2011)
Leonid Grčev (born 1951)
Ratko Janev (1939–2019), atomic physicist
Nataša Jonoska (born 1961)
Ljupčo Kocarev (born 1955)
Pasko Kuzman (born 1947), archaeologist
Ninoslav Marina (born 1974)
Petar Popovski (born 1973)
Zoran T. Popovski (born 1962)
Paskal Sotirovski (1927–2003), astrophysicist 
Boris P. Stoicheff (1924–2010), physicist

Social academics
Svetlana Antonovska (1952–2016), statistician
Dimitrija Čupovski (1878–1940), Macedonian national activist
Nace Dimov (1876–1916), Macedonian national activist
Slavko Milosavlevski (1928–2012), sociologist
Mihail Petruševski (1911–1990), found of College of Philosophy at Ss. Cyril and Methodius University of Skopje
Temko Popov (1855–1929)
Gjorgji Pulevski (1817–1893), first known author to publicly express in 1875 the idea of a separate Macedonian nation and language
Andrew Rossos (born 1941), Professor Emeritus of History at the University of Toronto
Traian Stoianovich (1921–2005), professor of history at Rutgers University

Arts

Music

Classical music

Composers
Atanas Badev (1860–1908)
Dimitrije Bužarovski (born 1952)
Kiril Makedonski (1925–1984)
Toma Prošev (1931–1996)
Todor Skalovski (1909–2004), composer of the Macedonian national anthem "Today over Macedonia"
Stojan Stojkov (born 1941)
Aleksandar Džambazov (1936–2022)

Conductors
Borjan Canev (born 1973)

Instrumentalists
Pianists

Simon Trpčeski (born 1979)

Opera singers
Blagoj Nacoski (born 1979)
Boris Trajanov (born 1959)

Popular and folk music

Composers
Darko Dimitrov (born 1973)
Slave Dimitrov (born 1946)
Jovan Jovanov (born 1981)
Ilija Pejovski (born 1947), composer and pianist
Trajko Prokopiev (1909–1979), infamous composer, who composed the soundtrack for the first Macedonian film Frosina

Musicians
Bodan Arsovski (born 1956)
Goran Trajkoski (born 1963)
Kiril Džajkovski (born 1965)
Chris Joannou (born 1979), bass guitarist
Tale Ognenovski (1922–2012)
Vlatko Stefanovski (born 1957)
Stevo Teodosievski (1924–1997)
Aleksandra Popovska (born 1975)

Singers and Bands
Lambe Alabakovski (born 1987)
Anastasia
Arhangel
Kristina Arnaudova (born 1979)
Kaliopi Bukle (born 1966)
Vladimir Četkar, jazz guitarist
Curse ov Dialect, alternative hip-hop group
Dani Dimitrovska (born 1979)
Karolina Gočeva (born 1980)
Vaska Ilieva (1923–2001)
Andrijana Janevska (born 1981)
Vlado Janevski (born 1960)
Jovan Jovanov (born 1985)
Leb i sol
Aleksandar Makedonski
Elvir Mekikj (born 1981)
Mizar
Jasmina Mukaetova (born 1981)
Eva Nedinkovska (born 1983)
Goce Nikolovski (1947–2006)
Blagica Pavlovska (born 1958)
Elena Petreska (born 1980)
Toše Proeski (1981–2007)
Elena Risteska (born 1986)
Aleksandar Sarievski (1922–2002)
Superhiks
Dan Talevski (born 1992)
Tamara Todevska (born 1985)
Tijana Todevska-Dapčević (born 1976)
Zoran Vanev (born 1973)
Elena Velevska (born 1980)
Rade Vrčakovski (born 1980)
Martin Vučić (born 1982)
Dragan Dautovski Quartet

Performing arts

Actors 
Kole Angelovski (born 1943)
Igor Džambazov (born 1963), actor, singer, comedian
Ljupka Džundeva (1934–2018)
Jelena Jovanova (born 1984)
Aco Jovanovski (1930–2016)
Meto Jovanovski (born 1946)
Vlado Jovanovski (born 1967)
Zafir Hadžimanov (1943–2021), actor, singer, composer
Gjorgji Kolozov (1948–2003)
Toni Mihajlovski (born 1967)
Labina Mitevska (born 1975)
Natasha Negovanlis (born 1990)
Petre Prličko (1907–1995)
Nikola Ristanovski (born 1969)
Petar Stojkoviḱ (born 1985)
Robert Veljanovski (born 1968)
Risto Šiškov (1940–1986)

Dancers
Nick Vanoff (1929–1991), dancer and producer

Filmmakers
Vladimir Blaževski (born 1955)
Kiril Cenevski (1943–2019)
Petar Gligorovski (1938–1995), animated film director and surrealist artist
Igor Ivanov (born 1973)
Tamara Kotevska (born 1993)
Milčo Mančevski (born 1959), Golden Lion-winning director
Kole Manev (born 1941)
Darko Mitrevski (born 1971), film director and screenwriter
Dimitrie Osmanli (1927–2006)
Stole Popov (born 1950)
Svetozar Ristovski (born 1972)
Ljubomir Stefanov (born 1975)
Sofija Trenčovska (born 1975)
Goran Trenčovski (born 1970)
Apostol Trpeski (born 1948)
Kiro Urdin (born 1945)

Theatre production
Bill Neskovski (1964–1989), playwright and actor
Naum Panovski (born 1950), theatre director

Visual arts

Architecture 
Slavko Brezoski (1922–2017)
Elpida Hadži-Vasileva (born 1971)
Janko Konstantinov (1926–2010)
Georgi Konstantinovski (1930–2020)
Mimoza Nestorova-Tomić (born 1929)
Živko Popovski (1934–2007)

Fashion design
Risto Bimbiloski (born 1975)
Nikola Eftimov (born 1968)
Mila Hermanovski (born 1969), costume and fashion designer
Toni Matičevski (born 1976)
Marjan Pejoski (born 1968)

Graphic design
Vlado Goreski (born 1958)
Miroslav Grčev (born 1955), designer of the Macedonian flag

Models 
Katarina Ivanovska (born 1988)

Multimedia 
Iskra Dimitrova (born 1965)

Painting 
Gavril Atanasov (1863–1951)
Dimitar Avramovski-Pandilov (1898–1963)
Rahim Blak (born 1983)
Angel Gavrovski (born 1942)
Vladimir Georgievski (1942–2017)
Maja Hill (born 1976)
Mice Jankulovski (born 1954), painter and cartoonist
Dimitar Kondovski (1927–1993)
Vangel Kodžoman (1904–1994)
Rubens Korubin (born 1949)
Lazar Ličenoski (1901–1964)
Petar Mazev (1927–1993)
Isaija Mažovski (1852–1926), painter and activist
Goran Menkov (born 1987)
Ordan Petlevski (1930–1997)
Nadja Petrovikj (born 1991)
Zivko Prendzov (born 1957)
Bobby Stojanov Varga (born 1972)
Dimo Todorovski (1910–1983)
Borislav Traikovski (1917–1996)
Keraca Visulčeva (1911–2004)
Tomo Vladimirski  (1904–1971)

Product design  
Stefan Janoski (born 1979), skateboarder and artist
Apostol Tnokovski (born 1982)

Sculpting 
Žarko Bašeski (born 1957)
Petar Hadži Boškov (1928–2015)
Tome Serafimovski (1935–2016)
Gligor Stefanov (born 1956)

Business
George Atanasoski (born 1952), founder of Microflex Inc. and MAK AM International Corporation
John Bitove (born 1960), founder of the Toronto Raptors
John Bitove, Sr. (1928–2015), restauranteur and philanthropist
Jordan Bitove, owner of Torstar, founder of Mobilicity, partial owner of SiriusXM Canada
Marjan Bojadžiev (born 1967), CEO of the National Bank of North Macedonia, board member of Skopje Chamber of Commerce
Lorne Bozinoff, founder and CEO of Forum Research
Vasil Eshcoff (1882–1961), pioneer of the Coney Island hot dog
Valentin Ilievski (born 1968), senior vice president of southeast Europe for Messer Group, president of assembly of FK Sarajevo
Christopher Ilitch (born 1965), president and CEO of Ilitch Holdings, Inc.
Marian Ilitch (born 1933), wife of Mike Ilitch and owner of Detroit's MotorCity Casino
Mike Ilitch (1929–2017), founder of Little Caesars and owner of Detroit Red Wings and Detroit Tigers
Kiradjieff brothers, creators of Cincinnati chili
Minčo Jordanov (born 1944), owner of multiple companies
Petar Kajevski (born 1974), founder of Najdi!
Jordan Kamčev (born 1970), owner of multiple companies, richest man in Macedonia as of 2015
Nada Laskovski, co-founder of UrbanToronto and Chart Attack
Lou Naumovski (born 1957), vice president and commercial/general director of Russia for Kinross Gold
Susan Niczowski (born 1966), CEO and founder of Summer Fresh Salads Inc.
Chris Pavlovski, CEO and founder of Rumble
Andy Peykoff (born 1976), owner of Niagara Bottling
Steve Stavro (1926–2006), founder of Knob Hill Farms, owner of Toronto Maple Leafs, director of Liquor Control Board of Ontario
Mike Zafirovski (born 1953), president and CEO of Nortel Networks and Board of Directors at Boeing

Journalism
Stefan Dedov (1869–1914)
Vasko Eftov (born 1967)
Branko Geroski
Tomislav Kezarovski (born 1965)
Dijamandija Mišajkov (1872–1953)
Nikola Mladenov (1964–2013)
Mihail Solunov (1877–1956)
Vlado Taneski (1952–2008)
Mirka Velinovska (born 1952)

Literature 
Gjorgji Abadžiev (1910–1963)
Petre M. Andreevski (1934–2006)
Stojan Hristov (1898–1995)
Živko Čingo (1935–1987)
Ljubomir Cuculovski (born 1948), philosopher and professor
Dimitar Dimitrov (born 1937), philosopher and diplomat
Lidija Dimkovska (born 1971), poet 
Elena Filipovska, philologist 
Bogomil Gjuzel (1939–2021)
Jordan Hadži Konstantinov-Džinot (1818–1882)
Vasil Iljoski (1902–1995)
Slavko Janevski (1920–2000), poet, writer, and author of the first Macedonian-language novel The village behind the seven ash trees
Mišo Juzmeski (1966–2021)
Blaže Koneski (1921–1993)
Risto Krle (1900–1975)
Katica Kulavkova (born 1951)
Vlado Maleski (1919–1984), author of the Macedonian national anthem "Today over Macedonia"
Stefan Markovski (born 1990), screenwriter, poet, philosopher
Mateja Matevski (1929–2018)
Krste Misirkov (1874–1926)
Kole Nedelkovski (1912–1941)
Olivera Nikolova (born 1936)
Anton Panov (1906–1967)
Sibila Petlevski (born 1964)
Vidoe Podgorec (1934–1997)
Aleksandar Prokopiev (born 1953)
Kočo Racin (1908–1943), poet, socialist, and author of the poetry collection White Dawns
Zvonko Taneski (born 1980), poet
Gane Todorovski (1929–2010)
Goce Smilevski (born 1975)
Milan Stoilov (1881–1903), writer and revolutionary
Aco Šopov (1923–1982), poet
Jovica Tasevski-Eternijan (born 1976)

Religion
Dositej II, Archbishop of Ohrid and Macedonia (1906–1981)
Mihail Gogov (1912–1999), fourth Archbishop of Ohrid and Macedonia
Kiro Stojanov (born 1959), Roman Catholic Bishop of Skopje
Stefan, Archbishop of Ohrid and Macedonia (born 1955)
Theodosius of Skopje (1846–1926), attempted to restore the Archbishopric of Ohrid as a separate Macedonian church
Jovan Vraniškovski (born 1966), head of Orthodox Ohrid Archbishopric

Revolutionaries 
Petar Pop Arsov (1868–1941)
Goce Delčev (1872–1903)
Dame Gruev (1871–1906)
Dimitar Vlahov (1878–1953)
Alekso Martulkov (1878–1962)
Rizo Rizov (1872–1950)
Jane Sandanski (1872–1915)
Boris Sarafov (1872–1907), revolutionary
Hristo Tatarchev (1869–1952), revolutionary and founder of IMRO
Smile Vojdanov (1872–1958), revolutionary and founder of the Macedonian People's League
Ilyo Maleshevski (1805–1898)

Sport

Athletics
Kristijan Efremov (born 1990), sprinter
Dario Ivanovski (born 1997), long distance runner
Daniela Kuleska (born 1981), middle distance runner
Ismail Mačev (1960–2019), sprinter
Riste Pandev (born 1994), sprinter
Elizabeta Pavlovska (born 1972), hurdler
Hristina Risteska (born 1991), sprinter
Ivana Rožman (born 1989), track and field
Vančo Stojanov (born 1977), middle distance runner
Mile Stojkoski (born 1965), long distance marathon paralympian
Jovan Stojoski (born 1997), sprinter
Aleksandra Vojnevska (born 1981), sprinter

American football
 Vlade Janakievski (born 1957), college football placekicker
 Paul Naumoff (1945–2018), NFL linebacker
 Pandel Savic (1925–2018), college football quarterback
 Pete Stoyanovich (born 1967), NFL placekicker

Association football

Vlatko Andonovski (born 1976), US women's national team manager
Zoran Baldovaliev (born 1983)
Milko Djurovski (born 1963), Olympic bronze medalist
Boško Gjurovski (born 1961)
Mario Gjurovski (born 1985)
Gjorgji Hristov (born 1976)
Čedomir Janevski (born 1961)
Marek Jankulovski (born 1977), Champions League winner
Jovan Kirovski (born 1976), first American to win Champions League
Dejan Kulusevski (born 2000)
Nemanja Matić (born 1988)
Uroš Matić (born 1990)
Goran Maznov (born 1981)
Igor Mitreski (born 1979)
George Nanchoff (born 1954)
Louis Nanchoff (born 1956)
Zlatko Nastevski (born 1957)
Chris Naumoff (born 1995)
Natalia Naumoff (born 1990)
Ilčo Naumoski (born 1983)
Ilija Nestorovski (born 1990)
Oka Nikolov (born 1974)
Jane Nikolovski (born 1973)
Darko Pančev (born 1965), Golden Boot and European Cup winner
Goran Pandev (born 1983), Champions League winner
Saško Pаndev (born 1987)
Robert Petrov (born 1978)
Goran Popov (born 1984)
Robert Popov (born 1982)
Stevica Ristić (born 1982)
Goce Sedloski (Гоце Седлоски)
Dragi Setinov (born 1961)
Goran Slavkovski (born 1989)
Mile Sterjovski (born 1979)
Veliče Šumulikoski (born 1981)
Goce Toleski (born 1977)
Vančo Trajanov (born 1978)
Jovica Trajčev (born 1981)
Ivan Tričkovski (born 1987)
Aleksandar Vasoski (born 1979)

Australian rules football
 Josh Daicos (born 1998), forward
 Peter Daicos (born 1961), Australian Football Hall of Fame inductee
 Nick Malceski (born 1984), 2014 All-Australian team member
 Mark Nicoski (born 1983), utility

Baseball
 Kevin Kouzmanoff (born 1981), MLB third baseman

Basketball

Jelena Antić (born 1991)
Pero Antić  (born 1982), NBA player
Gjorgji Čekovski (born 1979)
Slavica Dimovska (born 1985)
Todor Gečevski (born 1977)
Blagoja Georgievski (1950–2020), Olympic silver medalist
Vlado Ilievski (born 1980)
Andrej Jakimovski (born 2001), NCAA player
Petar Naumoski (born 1968), two-time EuroLeague champion
Kiril Nikolovski (born 1988)
Predrag Samardžiski (born 1986)
Darko Sokolov (born 1986)
Vrbica Stefanov (born 1973)
Damjan Stojanovski (born 1987)
Vojdan Stojanovski (born 1987)
Stojna Vangelovska (born 1964), Olympic silver medalist

Canoeing
Atanas Nikolovski (born 1980), slalom canoer
Lazar Popovski (born 1975), whitewater kayaker 
Nenad Trpovski (born 1978), slalom canoer
Ana Ugrinovska (born 1980), slalom canoer

Chess
Vlatko Bogdanovski (born 1964)
Aleksandar Colovic (born 1976)
Kiril Georgiev (born 1965)
Vladimir Georgiev (born 1975)
Zvonko Stanojoski (born 1964)

Cricket
 Len Pascoe (born 1950), Test and One Day International cricketer

Cycling
Andrej Petrovski (born 1996)
Stefan Petrovski (born 1991)
Gorgi Popstefanov (born 1987)

Golf
 Sandra Spuzich (1937–2015), LPGA Tour player

Handball

Stevče Aluševski (born 1972)
Tanja Andrejeva (born 1978)
Lasko Andonovski (born 1991)
Petar Angelov (born 1977)
Branislav Angelovski (born 1977)
Risto Arnaudovski (born 1981)
Filip Arsenovski (born 1998)
Stefan Atanasovski (born 1999)
Mirjeta Bajramoska (born 1984)
Andrea Beleska (born 1994)
Danilo Brestovac (born 1975)
Biljana Crvenkoska (born 1983)
Jane Cvetkovski (born 1987)
Gradimir Čanevski (born 1988)
Filip Čurlevski (born 1992)
Viktor Damceski (born 1996)
Nikola Danilovski (1997–2021)
Zlatko Daskalovski (born 1984)
Zorica Despodovska (born 1991)
Darko Dimitrievski (born 1993)
Dimitar Dimitrioski (born 1998)
Oliver Dimitrioski (born 1972)
Ivan Dimitrovski (born 1998)
Vasko Dimitrovski (born 1982)
Vancho Dimovski (born 1979)
Ivan Djonov (born 1997)
Stefan Drogrishki (born 1994)
Daniel Dupjačanec (born 1983)
David Gashoski (born 1996)
Goce Georgievski (born 1987)
Elena Gjeorgjievska (born 1990)
Daniel Gjorgjeski (born 1993)
Dushica Gjorgjievska (born 1987)
Goran Gjorgonoski (born 1979)
Simona Grozdanovska (born 1988)
Tomislav Jagurinovski (born 1998)
Aco Jonovski (born 1980)
Lenche Ilkova (born 1984)
Martin Karapalevski (born 2000)
Stefan Kimevski (born 1990)
Marko Kizikj (born 2001)
Alen Kjosevski (born 2001)
Dario Kofiloski (born 2000)
Kiril Kolev (born 1978)
Marjan Kolev (born 1977)
Nikola Kosteski (born 1992)
Goran Krstevski (born 1996)
Ilija Krstevski (born 1993)
Milorad Kukoski (born 1987)
Goran Kuzmanoski (born 1982)
Filip Kuzmanovski (born 1996)
Milan Lazarevski (born 1997)
Filip Lazarov (born 1985)
Kiril Lazarov (born 1980), all time Champions League top scorer
Milan Levov (born 1987)
Elena Livrinikj (born 1994)
Bojan Ljubevski (born 1996)
Bojan Madzovski (born 1994)
Borjan Madzovski (born 1994)
Dejan Manaskov (born 1992)
Martin Manaskov (born 1994)
Pepi Manaskov (born 1964)
Nikola Markoski (born 1990)
Velko Markoski (born 1986)
Andrej Markudov (born 1996)
Robertina Mečevska (born 1984)
Filip Mirkulovski (born 1983)
Marko Miševski (born 1999)
Petar Misovski (born 1976)
Andrej Mitikj (born 2000)
Vlatko Mitkov (born 1981)
Nikola Mitrevski (born 1985)
Dragica Mitrova (born 1987)
Mihajlo Mladenovikj (born 2000)
Nataša Mladenovska (born 1986)
Zlatko Mojsoski (born 1981)
Naumče Mojsovski (born 1980)
Dijana Naumoska (born 1985)
Vlado Nedanovski (born 1985)
Marko Neloski (born 1996)
Marko Ognjanovski (born 1997)
Goce Ojleski (born 1989)
Toše Ončev (born 1996)
Davor Palevski (born 1997)
Marija Papudjieva (born 1977)
Igor Pavlovski (born 1982)
Dejan Pecakovski (born 1986)
Dragana Pecevska (born 1983)
Antonio Peševski (born 1990)
Žarko Peševski (born 1991)
Dragana Petkovska (born 1996)
Kostadin Petrov (born 1992)
Martin Popovski (born 1994)
Nemanja Pribak (born 1984)
Sara Ristovska (born 1996)
Borko Ristovski (born 1982)
Ljubomir Savevski (born 1957)
Jovana Sazdovska (born 1993)
Martin Serafimov (born 2000)
Mice Shilegov (born 1998)
Marija Shteriova (born 1991)
Sara Stevanoska (born 1993)
Mitko Stoilov (born 1983)
Stojanče Stoilov (born 1987)
Nikola Stojčevski (born 1984)
Zvonko Šundovski (born 1967)
Filip Taleski (born 1996)
Jovan Talevski (born 1994)
Mario Tankoski (born 1998)
Vladimir Temelkov (born 1980)
Teodor Todeski (born 2002)
Martin Tomovski (born 1997)
Blagojče Trajkovski (born 1986)
Martin Velkovski (born 1997)

Ice hockey
 Mike Angelidis (born 1985), center
 Tommy Ivan (1911–1999), three-time Stanley Cup winning coach
 Dan Jancevski (born 1981), defenseman 
 Ed Jovanovski (born 1976), defenseman
 Steve Staios (born 1973), winger/defenseman
 Steven Stamkos (born 1990), two-time Stanley Cup winning, seven-time all-star center
 Alek Stojanov (born 1973), right winger
 Brandon Tanev (born 1991), left winger
 Christopher Tanev (born 1989), defenseman
 Michael Zigomanis (born 1981), center

Martial arts
Alen Amedovski (born 1988), mixed martial artist
Pete George (1929–2021), Olympic gold medalist weightlifter
Dejan Georgievski (born 1999), taekwondo Olympic silver medalist 
Puleksenija Jovanoska (born 1993), karateka 
Katerina Nikoloska (born 1990), judoka
Nina Nunes (born 1985), UFC flyweight fighter
Beni Osmanoski (born 1988), kickboxer
Emil Pavlov (born 1992), karateka
Ace Rusevski (born 1956), Olympic bronze medalist boxer
Vlatko Sokolov (born 1973), wrestler
Daniel Stefanovski (born 1996), kickboxer
Alexander Volkanovski (born 1988), UFC Featherweight champion, reached #1 in pound-for-pound rankings

Mountain climbing
Dimitar Ilievski-Murato (1953–1989), first Macedonian to climb Everest
Saško Kedev (born 1962), politician and third Macedonian to climb Everest

Racing
Igor Stefanovski (born 1982), two-time European Hill Climb champion

Rugby league
 Paul Momirovski (born 1996), centre and winger

Shooting
Borjan Brankovski (born 1996)
Nina Balaban (born 1995)
Olivera Nakovska-Bikova (born 1974)
Darko Naseski (born 1979)
Sašo Nestorov (born 1987)

Skiing
Darko Damjanovski (born 1981), biathlete and cross-country skier 
Gjoko Dineski (born 1972), cross-country skier
Ivana Ivchevska (born 1988), alpine skier
Stavre Jada (born 1998), cross-country skier
Rosana Kiroska (born 1991), cross-country skier
Marija Kolaroska (born 1997). cross-country skier
Gjorgi Markovski (born 1986), alpine skier
Jana Nikolovska (born 1979), alpine skier
Dejan Panovski (born 1980), alpine skier
Antonio Ristevski (born 1989), alpine skier
Aleksandar Stojanovski (born 1979), alpine skier
Viktorija Todorovska (born 2000), cross-country skier

Swimming
Marko Blaževski (born 1992)
Anastasia Bogdanovski (born 1993)
Atina Bojadži (1944–2010)
Mirjana Boševska (born 1981)
Biljana Coković (1982–2007)
Filip Derkoski (born 2000)
Mia Blazhevska Eminova (born 2005)
Kire Filipovski (born 1973)
Zoran Lazarovski (born 1980)
Simona Marinova (born 1994)
Aleksandar Malenko (born 1979)
Nataša Meškovska (born 1972)
Aleksandar Miladinovski (born 1979)
Eva Petrovska (born 2004)
Elena Popovska (born 1990)
Mihajlo Ristovski (born 1983)
Tomi Stefanovski
Vesna Stojanovska (born 1985)

Tennis
Lina Gjorcheska (born 1994), highest ranked Macedonian player to date
Kalin Ivanovski (born 2004)
Tomislav Jotovski (born 1990)
Aleksandar Kitinov (born 1971)
Marina Lazarovska (born 1978)
Lazar Magdinčev (born 1980)
Katarina Marinkovikj (born 1999)
Ellen Perez (born 1995)
Predrag Rusevski (born 1983)
Magdalena Stoilkovska (born 1996)

Volleyball
Vladimir Bogoevski (born 1953)
Gjorgi Gjorgiev (born 1992)
Nikola Gjorgiev (born 1988)

State

Politicians 

Metodija Andonov - Čento (1902–1957), first president of the People's Republic of Macedonia
Stojan Andov (born 1935)
Strašo Angelovski (born 1959)
Ljupčo Arsov (1910–1986)
Ljube Boškoski (born 1960)
Vlado Bučkovski (born 1962)
Paul Christie (born 1952), Toronto politician
Branko Crvenkovski (born 1962)
Jimmy Dimos (born 1938), politician, former Speaker of the Louisiana House
Ljubčo Georgievski (born 1966), founder of the political party VMRO-DPMNE
Kiro Gligorov (1917–2012), first president of the Republic of Macedonia
Vladimir Gligorov (1945–2022)
Tim Goeglein (born 1964), Deputy Director of Public Liaison, Office of Public Liaison, Executive Office of the President under George W. Bush
Nikola Gruevski (born 1970)
Denise Ilitch (born 1955), businesswoman, lawyer, and member of the Board of Regents of the University of Michigan  
Gjorge Ivanov (born 1960)
Gordana Jankuloska (born 1975)
Zoran Jolevski (born 1959), Macedonian Minister of Defense, Ambassador to the United States
Srgjan Kerim (born 1948)
Nikola Kljusev (1927–2008), first Prime Minister of Macedonia
Lazar Koliševski (1914–2000)
Hari Kostov (born 1959)
Dimitar Kovačevski (born 1974), current Prime Minister of North Macedonia
Trifun Kostovski (born 1946)
Hristijan Mickoski (born 1977), VMRO-DPMNE leader
Ilinka Mitreva (1950–2022)
Lazar Mojsov (1920–2011)
Stevo Pendarovski (born 1963), current President of North Macedonia
Tito Petkovski (born 1945)
Nikola Poposki (born 1977), Macedonian Minister of Foreign Affairs
Zoran Stavreski (born 1964), Deputy Prime Minister of Macedonia
Borko Temelkovski (1919–2001)
Lui Temelkovski (born 1954), Member of Canadian Parliament
Boris Trajkovski (1956–2004)
Vasil Tupurkovski (born 1951)
Zoran Zaev (born 1974), Prime Minister of (North) Macedonia

Partisans 

Mirče Acev (1915–1943)
Mihajlo Apostolski (1906–1987)
Jordan Cekov (1921–2019)
Emanuel Čučkov (1901–1967)
Čede Filipovski Dame (1923–1945)
Dimče Mirčev (1913–1944)
Blagoj Jankov Mučeto (1911–1944)
Orce Nikolov (1916–1942)
Strašo Pindžur (1915–1943)
Hristijan Todorovski Karpoš (1921–1944)
Julia Batino (1914–1942)
Gjorgi Dimitrovski Vikentiev (1920–1944)
Petar Zdravkovski (1912–1967)
Kuzman Josifovski - Pitu (1915–1944)
Vera Jocić (1923–1944)
Aco Karamanov (1927–1944)
Elpida Karamandi (1920–1942)
Fana Kočovska (1927–2004)
Veselinka Malinska (1917–1987)
Јordan Nikolov (1916–1942)
Katerina Nurdzhieva (1922–2018)
Blagoj Stračkovski (1920–1943)

Television 
Ziya Tong (born 1980), television producer, TV host

Notes

References

 
Macedonian
Ethnic group
Macedonians